Kuntur K'uchu (Quechua kuntur condor, k'uchu corner, "condor corner", Hispanicized spelling Condorcucho) is a mountain in the Wansu mountain range in the Andes of Peru, about  high. It is situated in the Arequipa Region, La Unión Province, Puyca District, and in the Cusco Region, Chumbivilcas Province, Santo Tomás District. It lies northwest of Qullpa and north of Pichaqani.

References 

Mountains of Arequipa Region
Mountains of Cusco Region